Saskatoon—Biggar  was a federal electoral district in Saskatchewan, Canada, that was represented in the House of Commons of Canada from 1968 to 1978.

This riding was created in 1966 from parts of Prince Albert, Rosetown—Biggar, Rosthern, Saskatoon and The Battlefords ridings.

It was abolished in 1976 when it was redistributed into Humboldt—Lake Centre, Kindersley—Lloydminster,  Prince Albert, Saskatoon West and The Battlefords—Meadow Lake ridings.

Election results

See also 

 List of Canadian federal electoral districts
 Past Canadian electoral districts

External links 

Former federal electoral districts of Saskatchewan